Stellatoma is a genus of sea snails, marine gastropod mollusks in the family Mangeliidae.

Species
Species within the genus Stellatoma include:
 Stellatoma mellissi (E. A. Smith, 1890)
 Stellatoma rufostrigata (Schepman, 1913)
 Stellatoma stellata (Stearns, 1872)

References

External links
 Bouchet, P.; Kantor, Y. I.; Sysoev, A.; Puillandre, N. (2011). A new operational classification of the Conoidea. Journal of Molluscan Studies. 77, 273-308
 Worldwide Mollusk Data base : Mangeliidae
 Bartsch, Paul, and Harald A. Rehder. "New turritid mollusks from Florida." Proceedings of the United States National Museum (1939).

 
Gastropod genera